Stratfield Saye House is a large stately home at Stratfield Saye in the north-east of the English county of Hampshire. It has been the home of the Dukes of Wellington since 1817.

Early history

The line of the Roman Road the Devil's Highway (Roman Britain) passes East to West just within the Northern boundary of the grounds of Stratfield Saye House 

The Manor of Stratfield Saye was created by the joining of two older manors. In the 12th century Stratfield was owned by the Stoteville family, and then early in the 13th century this passed by marriage to the Saye family.

Before 1370 the manor passed on again by marriage to the Dabridgecourts, and in 1629 they sold the property to the Pitt family, cousins of the great father-and-son Prime Ministers.

The main part of the house was extensively enlarged around 1630 by Sir William Pitt, Comptroller of the Household to King James I. Sir William's eldest son, Edward Pitt (1592-1643), MP, of Steepleton Iwerne, Dorset, and later of Stratfield Saye, bought the estate for £4,800 in 1629. Further extensive alterations were carried out to the house and park in the 18th century by George Pitt, 1st Baron Rivers.

Purchase by the state

The estate was purchased by the state in 1817, in order that it could be given by a grateful nation to the victorious Arthur Wellesley, 1st Duke of Wellington. The government gave £600,000 for the construction of a proposed "Waterloo Palace" to rival Blenheim Palace, home of the Dukes of Marlborough. The Hampshire site Wellington chose was the  estate of Stratfield Saye, home of the Pitt family. He was advised on the purchase by the architect Benjamin Dean Wyatt who had once been his private secretary. He originally planned to demolish the existing house, and replace it with a more prestigious home, to be known as Waterloo Palace. The Duke abandoned these plans in 1821 when they proved to be too expensive, and subsequently made numerous additions and improvements to the existing building. All but the 1st and 6th Dukes are buried at Stratfield Saye House.

The Wellington Exhibition
The stables are grade II listed buildings. They now contain the Wellington Exhibition, which depicts the life and times of the 1st Duke. It houses a large collection of military mementoes. The Duke's cast bronze funeral carriage, made from melted-down French cannons captured at the Battle of Waterloo, was moved to Stratfield Saye in the 1980s.

Duke of Wellington Commemorative Column

The Duke of Wellington Commemorative Column stands at the entrance to Stratfield Saye on the eastern Heckfield side. The Corinthian column, which can be viewed from the A33, is topped by a bronze statue by Baron Carlo Marochetti. The column was erected in 1863.

Places named after Stratfield Saye House
Strathfieldsaye, now a suburb of Bendigo in Victoria, Australia, was named after Strathfield Saye House. Between 1861 and 1994, there was also a Shire of Strathfieldsaye. The name of Strathfield, now a suburb of Sydney in New South Wales, Australia, also comes ultimately from Strathfield Saye House. The names of the suburbs of North Strathfield and Strathfield South, and the Municipality of Strathfield have the same origin.

In popular culture
Filming of the Steven Spielberg film War Horse began in August 2010 with the cavalry scenes being filmed at Stratfield Saye House, where Wellington's war horse, Copenhagen, is buried.

See also
Apsley House – the London home of the Dukes of Wellington
Waterloo ceremony
Walmer Castle - the residence of the 1st Duke as Lord Warden of the Cinque Ports

References

External links

 
 Victoria Hinshaw
 Hampshire Treasures, by Hampshire County Council and next page

Country houses in Hampshire
Museums in Hampshire
Historic house museums in Hampshire
Biographical museums in Hampshire
Military and war museums in England
Grade I listed buildings in Hampshire
Gardens in Hampshire
Prime ministerial homes in the United Kingdom
Grade I listed houses